NGC 766 is an elliptical galaxy located in the Pisces constellation about 362 million light years from the Milky Way. It was discovered by British astronomer John Herschel in 1828.

Due to NGC 766 being situated close to the celestial equator it is at least partly visible from both hemispheres in certain times of the year.

See also 
 List of NGC objects (1–1000)
John Hershel

References

External links 
 

Elliptical galaxies
766
Pisces (constellation)
007468